Groesbeck Independent School District is a public school district based in Groesbeck, Texas (USA).

In addition to Groesbeck, the district serves the towns of Kosse and Thornton. Located in Limestone County, small portions of the district extend into Falls and Robertson counties.

In 2008 Groesbeck ISD voters passed a 23 million dollar bond to build a new  Intermediate school, and to give every child in the school district to access to their very own laptop and equip every classroom as a 21st Century Classroom with a mounted, LCD projector, document camera, speaker system, DVD/VCR player and Eno Interactive Board.

In 2009, the school district was rated "academically acceptable" by the Texas Education Agency.

Schools 
 Groesbeck High School (Grades 9-12)
 Groesbeck Middle (Grades 7-8)
 1994-96 National Blue Ribbon School
 Groesbeck Elementary (Grades PK-6) – split into two campuses
 H.O. Whitehurst Campus (Grades PK-2)
 Enge-Washington Intermediate Campus (Grades 3-6)

References

External links 
 Groesbeck ISD
 Groesbeck ISD

School districts in Falls County, Texas
School districts in Limestone County, Texas
School districts in Robertson County, Texas